Lucie Jounier (born 16 July 1998) is a French professional racing cyclist, who currently rides for UCI Women's Continental Team . In October 2020, she rode in the women's edition of the 2020 Liège–Bastogne–Liège race in Belgium.

Major results

2015
 National Junior Road Championships
4th Time trial
7th Road race
 4th Chrono des Nations Women Espoirs
2016
 6th Time trial, National Junior Road Championships
2018
 7th Road race, National Road Championships
 8th Grand Prix International d'Isbergues
2019
 3rd Road race, National Under–23 Road Championships
2021
 4th Ronde de Mouscron
 4th GP Eco-Struct
 8th Omloop van de Westhoek - Memorial Stive Vermaut
 8th Dwars door de Westhoek
2022
 4th GP Oetingen

References

External links
 

1998 births
Living people
French female cyclists
People from Redon, Ille-et-Vilaine
Sportspeople from Ille-et-Vilaine
Cyclists from Brittany